Lecci may refer to:

 the sicilian name for Lecce
 Lecci, a commune in the Corse-du-Sud department of France on the island of Corsica